Idalia Manor is a historic home located at Mt. Pleasant, New Castle County, Delaware.  It was built about 1845, and consists of a -story, five bay, stuccoed brick main house with a two-story, two-bay stuccoed brick gable end kitchen addition. It has a gable roof covered with composition shingle and two endwall chimneys. The house is in the late Federal style. Also on the property are a contributing two-story braced frame granary and crib barn.

It was listed on the National Register of Historic Places in 1985.

References

Houses on the National Register of Historic Places in Delaware
Federal architecture in Delaware
Houses completed in 1845
Houses in New Castle County, Delaware
National Register of Historic Places in New Castle County, Delaware